Potassium voltage-gated channel subfamily S member 3 (Kv9.3) is a protein that in humans is encoded by the KCNS3 gene. KCNS3 gene belongs to the S subfamily of the potassium channel family. It is highly expressed in pulmonary artery myocytes, placenta, and parvalbumin-containing GABA neurons in brain cortex. In humans, single-nucleotide polymorphisms of the KCNS3 gene are associated with airway hyperresponsiveness, whereas decreased KCNS3 mRNA expression is found in the prefrontal cortex of patients with schizophrenia.

Function 
Voltage-gated potassium channels form the largest and most diversified class of ion channels and are present in both excitable and nonexcitable cells. Their main functions are associated with the regulation of the resting membrane potential and the control of the shape and frequency of action potentials. The alpha subunits are of 2 types: those that are functional by themselves and those that are electrically silent but capable of modulating the activity of specific functional alpha subunits. The Kv9.3 protein (encoded by KCNS3 gene) is not functional by itself but can form functional heteromultimers with Kv2.1 (encoded by KCNB1) and Kv2.2 (encoded by KCNB2) (and possibly other members) of the Shab-related subfamily of potassium voltage-gated channel proteins. Heteromeric Kv2.1/Kv9.3 channels form with fixed stoichiometry consisting of three Kv2.1 subunits and one Kv9.3 subunit.

See also 
 Voltage-gated potassium channel

References 

Ion channels